Lagos Open may refer to:
 Lagos Open (1976–1991)
 Lagos Open (2000–present)